The Wilaya of Relizane massacres of 4 January 1998 took place in three remote villages around Oued Rhiou about 150 miles (240 km) west of Algiers, during the Algerian conflict of the 1990s.   At least 172 villagers were killed in a single day of Ramadan:
 at Had Chekala, no residents survived; more than thirty guerrillas burned the village down afterwards
 at Remka, initial reports claimed 117 killed; in 2006, Prime Minister Ahmed Ouyahia declared that the true toll had been 1000, and that the government had "hid[den] the truth because you don't go into battle proclaiming defeat."  A survivor told La Tribune "One pregnant woman had her fetus cut out and slaughtered."
 at Ain Tarik, an unknown number were killed

The massacres were attributed to the GIA, and had been preceded some days before by the Wilaya of Relizane massacres of 30 December 1997.  They provoked mass population flight from the afflicted area - the population of Ramka, for instance, dropped from 9,200 in 1990 to 5,215 in 1998 - and led to international condemnation and calls for an independent investigation.

See also
 List of massacres in Algeria
 List of Algerian massacres of the 1990s

External links
 BBC
 BBC
 Irish Examiner
 CNN
 IDP Survey
 Algeria hid massacre toll

Algerian massacres of the 1990s
1998 in Algeria
Conflicts in 1998
Massacres in 1998
January 1998 events in Africa